SURG is a radio station of Australia.

Surg, Surag or Soorag may refer to the following villages in Iran:

 Surg, Birjand, South Khorasan Province
 Surag, Qaen, South Khorasan Province

See also
 Suraag – The Clue, an Indian detective television series